Manuel Camacho Meléndez (6 April 1929 – 24 September 2008) was a Mexican professional football goalkeeper who played for Mexico in the 1958 FIFA World Cup. He also played for Deportivo Toluca.

References

External links
 
FIFA profile

1929 births
2008 deaths
Place of death missing
Footballers from Jalisco
Association football goalkeepers
Mexico international footballers
1958 FIFA World Cup players
Club América footballers
C.D. Veracruz footballers
Asturias F.C. players
C.D. Atlético Marte footballers
Deportivo Toluca F.C. players
Atlante F.C. footballers
Chicago Spurs players
National Professional Soccer League (1967) players
Mexican expatriate footballers
Expatriate footballers in El Salvador
Mexican expatriate sportspeople in El Salvador
Expatriate soccer players in the United States
Mexican expatriate sportspeople in the United States
Mexican footballers